Division of China may refer to:

Administrative
 Administrative divisions of China, levels of local government in the People's Republic of China
 Administrative divisions of Taiwan, statutory subdivisions of the Republic of China

Historical eras and events
 Spring and Autumn period, historical period (771–476 BC) in which China was divided between many feudal states under the authority of the Zhou dynasty
 Warring States period, historical period (475–221 BC) in which China was divided between multiple rivalling states
 Three Kingdoms (AD 220–280), historical tripartite division of China among the states of Cao Wei, Shu Han and Eastern Wu
 Sixteen Kingdoms, historical period (AD 304–439) when northern China was fragmented into rivalling short-lived states
 Northern and Southern dynasties, historical period (AD 386–589) when China was divided in a north-south fashion
 Five Dynasties and Ten Kingdoms period, historical period (AD 907–979) of political upheaval and division in Imperial China
 Warlord Era, a period (1916–1928) when control of the Republic of China was divided among military cliques
 Chinese Civil War (1927–1937, 1946–1950) and the Cross-Strait conflict resulted in the division of the country into communist-controlled mainland and the incumbent government fleeing to Taiwan.

See also
 Administrative divisions of China (disambiguation)
 Chinese unification (disambiguation)
 People's Liberation Army, the armed forces of the People's Republic of China, which includes various military divisions
 Chinese Civil War, 1927–1949 civil war between the Republic of China and the Communist Party of China